The Nest is a BBC One five-part television drama series starring Sophie Rundle and Martin Compston as a married couple unable to conceive with Mirren Mack as the 18-year-old who offers to be their surrogate mother. Broadcasting began on 22 March 2020.

Cast
 Sophie Rundle as Emily Docherty
 Martin Compston as Dan Docherty
 Mirren Mack as Kaya
 James Harkness as James
 Fiona Bell as Hilary
 Liz Ewing as Janis
 Shirley Henderson as Siobhan
 David Hayman as Souter
 Bailey Patrick as Callum
 Katie Leung as Eleanor

Production
The Nest was filmed in Glasgow, East Kilbride, Paisley and Helensburgh. Emily (Sophie Rundle) and Dan's (Martin Compston) house in the series is called Cape Cove, a holiday rental house on the shore of Scotland's Loch Long. Speaking on finding the house, producer Clare Kerr said: "It was a challenge, but it was always in the script, and because water runs through the script as a kind of theme... We were really lucky in that nobody else had used it, because it's got such a particular look." The scenes where Emily is swimming were also filmed in Loch Long. Kaya's (Mirren Mack) flat is situated in Gorbals, while the fictional "Calderwood Falls" waterfall is located at the Devil's Pulpit. The Devil's Pulpit has previously been used as a setting for Starz period drama Outlander.

Episodes

References

External links

2020 British television series debuts
2020 British television series endings
2020s British drama television series
2020s Scottish television series
BBC television dramas
British thriller television series
English-language television shows
Television shows set in Scotland
Television series by All3Media